The One Eighty is the highest outdoor patio in Toronto, Ontario, Canada. Formerly known as Panorama Lounge, it is on the 51st floor of the Manulife Centre on Bloor Street.

External links
The One Eighty official website

Restaurants in Toronto